Hold On Love is an album released by the band Azure Ray. It was released October 7, 2003, on Saddle Creek Records.

It is the 54th release of Saddle Creek Records. The song "Across the Ocean" was featured in the Korean drama Coffee Prince.

Track listing
 "The Devil's Feet"  - 2:30
 "New Resolution"  - 3:23
 "We are Mice"  - 3:49
 "Look to Me" - 3:56
 "The Drinks We Drank Last Night"  - 4:01
 "Across the Ocean"  - 4:00
 "If You Fall"  - 3:03
 "Sea of Doubts"  - 3:36
 "Dragonfly"  - 2:13
 "Nothing Like a Song"  - 4:03
 "These White Lights will Bend to Make Blue"  - 4:08
 "Hold On Love"  - 3:17
 "Across the Ocean (video)"
 "We are Mice (live)"

Musicians
Orenda Fink
Maria Taylor
Clark Baechle – Drum Programming
Ben Armstrong – Drums
Andy LeMaster – Additional Instrumentation, Engineering, Mixing
Eric Bachmann – Additional Instrumentation, Production, Arrangement, Mixing
Mike Mogis – Pedal Steel, Engineering, Mixing
Doug Van Sloun – Mastering

References

External links
Saddle Creek Records

2003 albums
Azure Ray albums
Folktronica albums
Saddle Creek Records albums